Turton may refer to:

People
 Turton baronets

Surname
Andrew Turton (1938–2021), British anthropologist
Ashley Turton (1973–2011), American lobbyist and political staffer
Chad Turton (born 1974), birth name of Chad Kroeger
Cyril Turton (born 1921), English football centre back
Sir Edmund Turton, 1st Baronet of Upsall, York (1857–1929), British Conservative Party politician for Thirsk and Malton 1915–1929
Edmund Turton (athlete) (born 1932), Olympic athlete from Trinidad and Tobago
Enid Bakewell (née Turton; born 1940), played for the English women's cricket team

Geoff Turton (born 1944), British singer
Gibson Turton (1841–1891), New Zealand barrister and cricket player
Gerald Turton, owner of Upsall Castle
Harriet Bridgeman, Viscountess Bridgeman (née Victoria Harriet Lucy Turton; born 1942), founder of the Bridgeman Art Library
Henry Hanson Turton (1818–1887), Member of Parliament in Taranaki, New Zealand
 (1832–1881), chess problem composer; see Turton doubling
John Turton (1735–1806), English physician who treated King George III of Great Britain during the king's bouts of madness
Kett Turton (Birkett Kealy Turton; born 1982), Canadian television and film actor
Ollie Turton (born 1992), English football defender
Major Richard Turton, British colonial military officer who re-established the convict settlement at Norfolk Island
Robin Turton, Baron Tranmire (1903–1994), Life Peer and British Conservative Party politician for Thirsk and Malton
Searle Turton (born 1979), Canadian politician
Sue Turton (born c. 1966), British television journalist
Stuart Turton, author of the 2018 novel The Seven Deaths of Evelyn Hardcastle
Sir Thomas Turton, 1st Baronet of Starborough Castle, Surrey (1764–1844), MP for Southwark
Thomas Turton DD (1780–1864), English academic and divine, the Bishop of Ely
Sir Thomas Edward Michell Turton, 2nd Baronet of Starborough Castle, Surrey (1790–1854); see Turton baronets
William Turton (1762–1835), British naturalist

Places

Australia
Point Turton, South Australia

United Kingdom
Turton, Lancashire, a historical area, township and former civil parish now partly in Greater Manchester
Turton Urban District, a former urban district in Lancashire
North Turton, a civil parish of the Unitary Authority of Blackburn with Darwen in Lancashire
South Turton, an unparished area of the Metropolitan Borough of Bolton, in Greater Manchester
Turton and Edgworth railway station, formerly on what is now the Northern Rail 'Ribble Valley Line
Turton and Entwistle Reservoir, a water reservoir in the town of Edgworth, Lancashire
Turton Tower, Chapeltown, Lancashire, a 15th-century manor house

United States
Turton, South Dakota

Organisations
Turton F.C., a football club based in Edgworth, Lancashire, England
Turton High School (1915–1956), a secondary school in Turton, South Dakota, U.S.
Turton School, a mixed comprehensive secondary school and sixth form in Bromley Cross, in the Metropolitan Borough of Bolton

Other uses
Turton doubling, a manoeuvre found in chess problems
Turton River, Victoria, Australia
Sir Basil and Lady Turton, characters in the British television series Tales of the Unexpected

See also